Two Brothers in Trinity or Two Brothers in a Place Called Trinity is a 1972 Italian Spaghetti Western low comedy film directed by Renzo Genta and Richard Harrison, and produced by Fernando Piazza. It was originally called Due Fratelli (Two Brothers). It stars Gino Marturano, Luciano Rossi, and Osiride Pevarello.

In this film the half brothers pair Jesse and Lester converges to lay their hands and what keepst them together is their inherited mind, as between Hallelujah and Sartana in Alleluja e Sartana, figli di... Dio (1972), the hero and the monk in Tedeum (1972) and Slim and the pizza baker/preacher in Posate le pistole... reverendo (1971).

Cast

References

Bibliography

External links
 

Spaghetti Western films
Italian Western (genre) comedy films
Films scored by Carlo Savina
Plaion
1970s Western (genre) comedy films
1970s Italian films